La vita agra, known in English-speaking countries as It's a Hard Life, is a novel by Luciano Bianciardi published in 1962 by Rizzoli. It became a best-seller in Italy and it is considered one of the most important novels in contemporary Italian literature.

In 1962, when the novel was released it was praised by the public and the critics. It became a best-seller and was translated into English, French, German and Spanish. Italo Calvino wrote a review in which he regarded the novel positively and compared it to other works of the so-called letteratura industriale (Industrial literature), a current which spread at the beginning of the Italian economic miracle, such as Paolo Volponi's Memoriale and Giovanni Arpino's Una nuvola d'ira. He praised the all-encompassing language that succeeds masterfully in expressing and representing the industrial reality in a more complex way, even if he saw some weaknesses connected to the book's uncontainable autobiography that is limited, in his opinion, to a "private anarchist protest".

The novel was also made into a 1964 film of the same name, directed by Carlo Lizzani and starring Ugo Tognazzi and Giovanna Ralli.

English editions
La vita agra: or, It’s a Hard Life, Hodder & Stoughton, London, 1965; translation by Eric Mosbacher.
La vita agra. It's a Hard Life, Viking Press, New York, 1965; translation by Eric Mosbacher.

References

1962 novels
Italian novels adapted into films
Novels set in Milan